Eric Metaxas (born 1963) is an American author, speaker, and conservative radio host. He has written three biographies, Amazing Grace: William Wilberforce and the Heroic Campaign to End Slavery about William Wilberforce (2007), Bonhoeffer: Pastor, Martyr, Prophet, Spy about Dietrich Bonhoeffer (2011), Martin Luther: The Man Who Rediscovered God and Changed the World (2017), If  You Can Keep it (2017), Fish Out of Water: A Search for the Meaning of Life (2021) and Letter to the American Church (2022). He has also written humor, children's books and scripts for VeggieTales.

Biography
Metaxas was born in the New York City neighborhood of Astoria, Queens and grew up in Danbury, Connecticut.  He graduated from Yale University (1984, B.A., English).  While there, he edited the Yale Record, the nation's oldest college humor magazine. Metaxas lives in Manhattan with his wife and daughter. He is Greek on his father's side and German on his mother's; he was raised in a Greek Orthodox environment.

Although he was raised in the Greek Orthodoxy and has not formally left the denomination (saying he has "great respect" for it), Metaxas has attended Calvary-St. George's Episcopal Church. He has spoken at Times Square Church. Metaxas describes himself as a "Mere Christian" in the words of C.S. Lewis. In 2007, he said his books "don't touch upon anything at all where Protestants, Catholics, and Orthodox Christians differ. They express just the basics of the faith, from a basic, ecumenical Christian viewpoint. They only talk about the Christian faith that they have agreement on." In his book Martin Luther, however, Metaxas criticized the political power structures that had emerged from the medieval Catholic Church and that it was only with Luther that the "true Gospel" was rescued "from under its crushing welter of ecclesiastical and political medieval structures."

Writing
Metaxas is the author of more than thirty children’s books, including the bestsellers Squanto and the Miracle of Thanksgiving and It's Time to Sleep, My Love, illustrated by Nancy Tillman. His books have been translated into more than twenty-five languages.

Metaxas's works If You Can Keep It: The Forgotten Promise of American Liberty and Miracles: What They Are, Why They Happen, and How They Can Change Your Life are both New York Times best-selling books.

Metaxas's biography of Wilberforce, Amazing Grace: William Wilberforce and the Heroic Campaign to End Slavery, was the companion book to the 2006 film.

Bonhoeffer: Pastor, Martyr, Prophet, Spy was named the 2010 Evangelical Christian Publishers Association Christian Book of the Year. Bonhoeffer is a New York Times best seller, climbing to #1 in the e-book category. It also won the 2011 John C. Pollock Award for Christian Biography awarded by Beeson Divinity School and a 2011 Christopher Award. Although the book is popular in the United States among evangelical Christians, Bonhoeffer scholars have criticized Metaxas's book as unhistorical, theologically weak, and philosophically naive. Professor of German history and Bonhoeffer scholar Richard Weikart, for example, credits his "engaging writing style," but claims Metaxas has a lack of intellectual background to interpret Bonhoeffer properly. The biography has also been criticized by Bonhoeffer scholars Victoria Barnett and Clifford Green. Despite these widespread and substantial criticisms of his work by experts on Bonhoeffer, Metaxas' book has been praised by popular magazines as a "weighty, riveting analysis of the life of Dietrich Bonhoeffer" which "bring[s] Bonhoeffer and other characters to vivid life".

Martin Luther: The Man Who Rediscovered God and Changed the World became a New York Times best-selling book in October 2017  and claimed a New York Times Editor's Pick in December 2017. Carlos Eire gave the book a full page review in the New York Times, stating, "Metaxas knows how to tell a story and how to develop characters, and this talent makes his narrative at once gripping and accessible." He also accused Metaxas of doing naive Whig history, portraying Luther as "a titanic figure who single-handedly slays the dragon of the Dark Ages, rescues God from an interpretive dungeon, invents individual freedom and ushers in modernity." Catholic church historian John Vidmar writes that Metaxas ignored more than a century of scholarship on Luther in order to write a "sweeping and largely uncritical endorsement for Martin Luther." In order to reach his conclusions, Vidmar writes, "Metaxas needs to misunderstand, denigrate, and then caricature centuries of human effort and achievement in language that is colloquial, casual, and often flippant."

If You Can Keep It: The Forgotten Promise of American Liberty, released June 14, 2016.

Seven More Men, released in April 2020, is the sequel to Seven Men.

Is Atheism Dead?, released October 19, 2021, is a response to the 1966 TIME cover Is God Dead?.

Fish Out of Water: A Search for the Meaning of Life was released on February 2, 2021.

Letter to the American Church was released September 20, 2022.

Other writing has been published in the Atlantic Monthly, The New York Times, and The Wall Street Journal.

Political views
Metaxas is a prominent supporter of Donald Trump. In 2019, Metaxas published two children's books called Donald Builds the Wall and Donald Drains the Swamp in a series called "Donald the Caveman". Other characters in the book include those Metaxas has called "an angry little girl who looks a little bit like AOC" and "an angry, crazy old man who looks a little bit like a guy named Bernie." In a November 2019 interview with Franklin Graham, Metaxas said that "screaming protesters" to Trump were "almost demonic".

Leaving a speech at the White House in August 2020, Metaxas punched a demonstrator who was riding a bike through a group of individuals dressed in formal attire. Bishop Harry Jackson, who was with Metaxas, claimed the protester had been swerving close to Metaxas while swearing at the group and at the president, and that it was so intimidating that he wondered if he’d have to use his cane for defense. The protester disputed this characterization and stated he may pursue a civil case against Metaxas.

After the 2020 presidential election, Metaxas endorsed Donald Trump's claim that the election was tainted by voter fraud, predicting on Twitter: "Trump will be inaugurated. For the high crimes of trying to throw a U.S. presidential election, many will go to jail." Metaxas also told Trump on Metaxas's radio show that "Jesus is with us in this fight" to overturn the 2020 election. "I'd be happy to die in this fight," Metaxas added.

Amid the COVID-19 pandemic, Metaxas told his followers not to get the vaccine.

Radio show
In April 2015, Metaxas began hosting The Eric Metaxas Show. The show is a two-hour, daily, nationally-syndicated radio program broadcast from the Empire State Building in New York and syndicated by the Salem Radio Network. Notable guests have included Dick Cavett, David Brooks, Kirsten Powers, Kathie Lee Gifford, N. T. Wright, Peter Hitchens (brother of Christopher Hitchens), Jimmie "J.J." Walker, Andrew Garfield, Maria Butina, Milo Yiannopoulos, Ross Douthat, Tony Shalhoub, Morgan Freeman, Jeff Allen, Senator Rand Paul, Joseph Fiennes, Darryl Strawberry, and Suzy Welch.

Eric Metaxas also broadcasts on the Salem News Channel. His show began streaming on the Salem News Channel in November 2021.

Other activities

Metaxas is the founder and host of a New York City event series called "Socrates in the City: Conversations on the Examined Life," where he interviews thinkers and writers, and is labeled as a forum on "life, God, and other small topics" in Metaxas' book about the series. Guests to SItC have been the likes of, and not limited to Francis Collins, Malcolm Gladwell, Sir John Polkinghorne, Kathleen Norris, Richard John Neuhaus, Dick Cavett, N. T. Wright, Jean Bethke Elshtain, Dm. Alice von Hildebrand, Peter Hitchens, Sir Jonathan Sacks, and Caroline Kennedy.

In the late 1990s Metaxas wrote BreakPoint radio commentaries for former Richard Nixon aide and Prison Fellowship founder Charles "Chuck" Colson. Upon Colson's death in 2012, Metaxas, along with John Stonestreet, became the voice of BreakPoint, which now airs weekdays on 1350 outlets across the country.

On February 2, 2012, Metaxas was the keynote speaker for the 2012 National Prayer Breakfast. Metaxas has testified before Congress about the rise of anti-Semitism in the U.S. and abroad, and he spoke at the Conservative Political Action Conference in 2013 and 2014 on the issue of Religious Freedom.

Metaxas was awarded the Becket Fund's Canterbury Medal in 2011 and the Human Life Review's Defender of Life Award in 2013. Metaxas has received honorary doctorate degrees from Hillsdale College, Liberty University, Sewanee: The University of the South, Ohio Christian University, and Colorado Christian University.

References

External links

 
 

1963 births
American children's writers
American Christian writers
American columnists
American magazine writers
American people of German descent
American people of Greek descent
American religious writers
Living people
The Yale Record alumni